Gabrielle McFadden is an Irish former Fine Gael politician who served as a Senator for the Cultural and Educational Panel from 2016 to 2020. She served as a Teachta Dála (TD) for the Longford–Westmeath constituency from 2014 to 2016.

The by-election was caused by the death of her sister Nicky McFadden, who was a Fine Gael TD. In December 2014, she was appointed to the Public Accounts Committee and to the Select Committee on Justice, Defence and Equality.

McFadden was a member of Westmeath County Council for the Athlone local electoral area from 2009 to 2014. She was the Mayor of Athlone from 2013 to 2014. She vacated her council seat before the Dáil by-election.

She lost her Dáil seat at the 2016 general election. She was subsequently elected to Seanad Éireann for the Cultural and Educational Panel. She was the Fine Gael Seanad Spokesperson on Defence. She was an unsuccessful candidate for the Longford–Westmeath constituency at the 2020 general election. She lost her Seanad seat at the 2020 Seanad election.

References

Living people
Fine Gael TDs
Local councillors in County Westmeath
Mayors of places in the Republic of Ireland
Members of the 25th Seanad
21st-century women members of Seanad Éireann
Members of the 31st Dáil
21st-century women Teachtaí Dála
Fine Gael senators
Alumni of Athlone Institute of Technology
Year of birth missing (living people)